The Unnamables is the only album recorded by Magma under the alias Univeria Zekt. Released in 1972, the album shows a more accessible jazz fusion sound, in an attempt to reach a broader audience, compared to the harsher, less accessible sounds of Magma's self-titled debut album.

Recording

The Unnamables was designed to ease listeners into the musical world of Magma. Recorded by essentially the same line-up as on 1001° Centigrades (1971), the album basically repeats the stylistic development shown through Magma's first two albums, while abandoning the science fiction concept of the Kobaïan story.

Three tracks from Lasry and one from Cahen on the first half of the album approximate the accessibility of the better-known jazz-rock of the time. Vander's pieces on the second half of the album, however, begin to explore similar musical ground to that found on 1001° Centigrades. Two of Vander's pieces can also be found on the 1970 soundtrack to 24 heures seulement and are available on the Archiw I CD in the Studio Zünd 12 disc box collection. The Unnamables was originally released on the record label Thélème, and reissued on Cryonic in 1986 and on Musea in 1993.

Track listing

Side One 
 "You Speak and Speak Colegram" - 2:10 (Lasry)
 "Altcheringa" - 3:27 (Cahen, Zabu)
 "Clementine" - 3:00 (Lasry)
 "Something's Cast a Spell" - 4:16 (Lasry, Ledissez)

Side Two 
 "Ourania" - 4:23 (Vander)
 "Africa Anteria" - 11:30 (Vander)
 "Undia" - 4:47 (Vander)

Personnel 
 Lucien "Zabu" Zabuski – vocals (2)
 Lionel Ledissez – vocals (4)
 Klaus Blasquiz – vocals (4, 7), percussion
 Teddy Lasry – saxophones, flute, organ
 Jeff Seffer – saxophones
 Tito Puentes – trumpet
 Francois Cahen – pianos
 Claude Engel – electric and acoustic guitars
 Francis Moze – bass guitar, organ
 Christian Vander – drums, percussion, voice (6)

References

External links
 The Unnamables at www.progarchives.com
 The Unnamables at Discogs
 The Unnamables at AllMusic

1972 albums
Jazz fusion albums by French artists
Magma (band) albums